An active chromatin sequence (ACS) is a region of DNA in a eukaryotic chromosome in which histone modifications such as acetylation lead to exposure of the DNA sequence thus allowing binding of transcription factors and transcription to take place. Active chromatin may also be called euchromatin. ACSs may occur in non-expressed gene regions which are assumed to be "poised" for transcription. The sequence once exposed often contains a promoter to begin transcription. At this site acetylation or methylation can take place causing a conformational change to the chromatin. At the active chromatin sequence site deacetylation can caused the gene to be repressed if not being expressed.

See also

Chromatin

References

Genetics